The Third County Courthouse is an 1837 Greek Revival building at 302 Center Street in Historic Richmond Town, near the geographic center of Staten Island, New York. Preceded by two smaller courthouses, it was the Richmond County Courthouse during most of the nineteenth century and was in use until 1919, when it was replaced by the Richmond County Courthouse in St. George.

The building is the oldest extant structure in New York City built primarily as a courthouse. A jail used to be adjacent. The building was the site of the sensational 1844 trial of Polly Bodine, who was accused of murdering her husband's sister and niece and setting fire to their house, a case commented on by Edgar Allan Poe and P. T. Barnum, among others. The packed trial resulted in a hung jury and then an early case of change of venue, first to Manhattan, which resulted in a conviction, later overturned, and then to Newburgh, New York, where Bodine was acquitted.

See also
List of New York City Designated Landmarks in Staten Island
National Register of Historic Places listings in Richmond County, New York

References

External links

Government buildings completed in 1837
Courthouses in New York (state)
Government buildings in Staten Island
New York City Designated Landmarks in Staten Island
Historic American Buildings Survey in New York City
Historic Richmond Town
Former courthouses in New York (state)